In finance, the Black–Litterman model is a mathematical model for portfolio allocation developed in 1990 at Goldman Sachs by Fischer Black and Robert Litterman, and published in 1992. It seeks to overcome problems that institutional investors have encountered in applying modern portfolio theory in practice. The model starts with an asset allocation based on the equilibrium assumption (assets will perform in the future as they have in the past) and then modifies that allocation by taking into account the opinion of the investor regarding future asset performance.

Background
Asset allocation is the decision faced by an investor who must choose how to allocate their portfolio across a number of asset classes. For example, a globally invested pension fund must choose how much to allocate to each major country or region.

In principle modern portfolio theory (the mean-variance approach of Markowitz) offers a solution to this problem once the expected returns and covariances of the assets are known. While modern portfolio theory is an important theoretical advance, its application has universally encountered a problem: although the covariances of a few assets can be adequately estimated, it is difficult to come up with reasonable estimates of expected returns.

Black–Litterman overcame this problem by not requiring the user to input estimates of expected return; instead it assumes that the initial expected returns are whatever is required so that the equilibrium asset allocation is equal to what we observe in the markets. The user is only required to state how his assumptions about expected returns differ from the markets and to state his degree of confidence in the alternative assumptions. From this, the Black–Litterman method computes the desired (mean-variance efficient) asset allocation.

In general, when there are portfolio constraints – for example, when short sales are not allowed – the easiest way to find the optimal portfolio is to use the Black–Litterman model to generate the expected returns for the assets, and then use a mean-variance optimizer to solve the constrained optimization problem.

See also

 Markowitz model for portfolio optimization

References

 Black F. and Litterman R.: Asset Allocation Combining Investor Views with Market Equilibrium, Journal of Fixed Income, September 1991, Vol. 1, No. 2: pp. 7-18 
 Black F. and Litterman R.: Global Portfolio Optimization, Financial Analysts Journal, September 1992, pp. 28–43

External links
Discussion
 Guangliang He and Robert Litterman: The Intuition Behind Black-Litterman Model Portfolios
 A. Meucci: The Black-Litterman Approach: Original Model and Extensions
 Jay Walters: The Black-Litterman Model in Detail
 Thomas M. Idzorek: A Step-By-Step Guide to the Black-Litterman Model - Incorporating user-specified confidence levels

Resources
Spreadsheet implementations:
Peter Ponzo
 Implementation in Python Notebook and case study analysis
Applets: 
Canlin Li

Financial models
Investment
Portfolio theories